Dark Orgasm is the twenty-first solo album by Julian Cope, released in 2005. It contains eight songs of guitar-heavy hard rock split into two short CDs. Alexis Petridis of The Guardian described the album as "a roughly recorded Stooges-meets-prog concept album about atheism and feminism". 
It was dedicated to "Freedom and Equality for Women".

Track listing

All songs and poems written by Julian Cope

Disc one
"Zoroaster" — 4:05
"White Bitch Comes Good" — 3:46
"She's Got a Ring on Her Finger (& Another Through Her Nose)" — 4:01
"Mr. Invasion" — 3:19
"Nothing to Lose Except My Mind" — 3:47
"I've Found a New Way to Love Her" — 3:59
"I Don't Wanna Grow Back" — 4:10

Disc two
"The Death & Resurrection Show" — 20:58
 (untitled) — 0:35

Poetry (printed in booklet)
"Who Makes the Festival Under the Hill?"
"Creedist Blues"
"No Second Opinion"

Note
Track 2 on disc two is the first 35 seconds of "The Death & Resurrection Show".

Personnel
Credits adapted from the album's liner notes.

Musicians
Julian Cope — vocals, guitar, bass, mellotron, arrangement
Anthony "Doggen" Foster (credited as Døgntank) — lead guitar, bass guitar, arrangement 
Ian "Mister E." Bissett — drums, arrangement
Technical
Julian Cope — producer, directed by, mixing engineer
Terry Dobbin — recorded by
Adam "Randy Apostle" Whittaker — recorded by, mixing engineer, mastering engineer
Benji Bartlett — photography
Christopher Patrick "Holy" McGrail — design

References

External links
Dark Orgasm on Discogs.com

2005 albums
Julian Cope albums